Botsogo Mpedi (born 3 February 2003) is a Botswanan cricketer who represents Botswana at international level. She is fondly nicknamed Mochudi Express.

Early life 
She pursued her interest in the sport of cricket in 2013 when she was in Stand Four at Rasesa Primary School. She was selected to the Kgatleng regional cricket team after impressing at a schools competition held in Mochudi. She was subsequently selected to Botswana national U-13 cricket team in 2014 and was also later approached by the national U-19 set-up as the youngest member of the squad. She spent nearly a month in India in order to follow a cricket course. She idolised Indian opening batter Smriti Mandhana when growing up. She also studied at Molefi Senior Secondary School.

Career 
She made her WT20I debut on 20 August 2018 at the age of 15 against Lesotho during the 2018 Botswana Cricket Association Women's T20I Series and had a memorable international debut by claiming a six-wicket haul inside her three overs spell. Her bowling effort helped Botswana to secure a thumping win over Lesotho by a massive margin of 124 runs. She also became the first bowler to take a five-wicket haul as well as a six-wicket haul on WT20I debut. She held the record for the best ever bowling figures on Women's T20 International debut before being surpassed by Nepal's Anjali Chand who claimed 6/0 against Maldives at the 2019 South Asian Games. Mpedi also became the youngest woman cricketer to pick up five-wicket haul in a WT20I at the age of 15 as well as the youngest debutant to do so. She also picked up the second ever six-wicket haul in WT20I history after New Zealand's Amy Satterthwaite when she grabbed her career best figures of 6/8 in 2.3 overs spell at the Botswana Cricket Association Oval. She was awarded the player-of-the-match for her outstanding bowling display in the field which sparked a batting collapse of Lesotho who bowled out for a modest total of just 40 runs in a run chase of 165. Although Botswana failed to qualify for the final of the six nation tournament, Mpedi managed to impress with her bowling efforts as a consolation for the hosts by ending up as the leading wicket taker of the Botswana Cricket Association Women's T20I Series with 14 scalps.

In June 2021, she was included in Botswana's lineup for the 2021 Kwibuka Women's T20 Tournament. However, Botswana failed to win any of their matches in the five team competition which also included Namibia, Kenya, hosts Rwanda and Nigeria.

In September 2021, she was named in Botswana's squad for the 2021 ICC Women's T20 World Cup Africa Qualifier tournament in Botswana.

See also 

 List of five-wicket hauls in women's Twenty20 International cricket

References 

2003 births
Living people
Botswana cricketers
Botswana women Twenty20 International cricketers
Place of birth missing (living people)